Senarpont is a commune in the Somme department and Hauts-de-France region of northern France.

Geography
Senarpont is situated at the confluence of the rivers Liger and Bresle some 42 km west of Amiens, on the D1015 road.

Population

See also
Communes of the Somme department

References

Communes of Somme (department)